1-Octene is an organic compound with a formula CH2CHC6H13. The alkene is classified as a higher olefin and alpha-olefin, meaning that the double bond is located at the alpha (primary) position, endowing this compound with higher reactivity and thus useful chemical properties. 1-Octene is one of the important linear alpha olefins in industry. It is a colourless liquid.

Synthesis
In industry, 1-octene is commonly manufactured by two main routes: oligomerization of ethylene and by Fischer–Tropsch synthesis followed by purification. Another route to 1-octene that has been used commercially on a small scale is dehydration of alcohols. Prior to the 1970s, 1-octene was also manufactured by thermal cracking of waxes, whereas linear internal octenes were also manufactured by chlorination/dehydrochlorination of linear alkanes.

There are five commercial processes that oligomerize ethylene to 1-octene. Four of these processes produce 1-octene as a part of a wide distribution of alpha-olefins. In typical circumstances, 1-hexene content of the entire distribution of alpha-olefins ranges from about 25% of the distribution in the Ethyl (Innovene) process to about 8% of distribution in some modes of the Gulf (CP Chemicals) and Idemitsu processes.

The only commercial process to isolate 1-octene from a wide mixture of C8 hydrocarbons is practiced by Sasol, a South African oil and gas and petrochemical company. For commercial purposes, Sasol employs Fischer–Tropsch synthesis to make fuels from synthesis gas derived from coal and recovers 1-octene from these fuel streams, where the initial 1-octene concentration in a narrow distillation cut may be 60%, with the remainder being vinylidenes, linear and branched internal olefins, linear and branched paraffins, alcohols, aldehydes, carboxylic acids, and aromatic hydrocarbons.

In recent years, two on-purpose 1-octene technologies have been commercialised: a butadiene telomerization plant (Dow, Tarragona), and a 1-heptene to 1-octene plant based on a Fischer-Tropsch-derived C7 olefin stream (Sasol, Secunda). Sasol is currently in the engineering phase of a new 1-octene technology based on selective tetramerisation of ethylene.

Applications
The main use of 1-octene is as a comonomer in production of polyethylene. High-density polyethylene (HDPE) and linear low-density polyethylene (LLDPE) use approximately 2–4% and 8–10% of comonomers, respectively.

Another significant use of 1-octene is for production of linear aldehyde via oxo synthesis (hydroformylation) to give the C9 aldehyde (nonanal). Oxidation of this aldehyde gives the short-chain fatty acid nonanoic acid. Hydrogenation of the same aldehyde gives the fatty alcohol 1-nonanol, which is used as a plasticizer.

References

Alkenes